Who's That Woman? may refer to:

 "Who's That Woman?" (Desperate Housewives)
 "Who's That Woman?", a song from the Broadway musical Follies